People’s Trust Insurance Company is a Florida home insurance company located in the Research Park at Florida Atlantic University in Deerfield Beach, Florida. People’s Trust Insurance is privately held and is the eleventh largest homeowners insurance company in the state with more than 110,000 policyholders throughout Florida.

According to the South Florida Business Journal, People’s Trust Insurance was the second-fastest growing company in South Florida from 2012 to 2014. The home insurance company has more than 350 employees, with 300 in Deerfield Beach.

In 2013, People’s Trust Insurance received the Governor’s Innovators in Business Award, which recognizes Florida companies in select industries that have influenced the state’s economic growth and diversification over the last year.
Independent financial analysis firm Demotech assigned People’s Trust Insurance a Financial Stability Rating of "A", Exceptional.

Resources

The company includes an affiliation with Florida’s largest insurance restoration general contractor, the Rapid Response Team LLC. The Rapid Response Team operates 11 response centers across Florida with more than 325 full-time construction technicians and roofers, 150 service trucks and millions of dollars in recovery supplies.

Current executives
 George Schaeffer - Co-Founder and Chief Executive Officer
 Tom Gallagher - Chief Operating Officer
 George De Heer - Chief Financial Officer
 Brett Frankel - Chief Compliance Officer and Corporate Counsel
 Amy Rosen - Chief Marketing and Communications Officer
 Irina Schaeffer - Executive Vice President, People’s Trust Holdings
 Kevin Walton -  Executive Director of Product Development and Reinsurance
 Steve Berman - Managing Director & Real Estate Development, Rapid Response Team LLC

Past company executives
 Michael Gold - Co-Founder and Chief Executive Officer - died January 26, 2014
 Mitch Politzer - President and Chief Operating Officer - retired 2015

Awards and recognition

Lawsuit

In November, 2013, an appellate court upheld a jury award of $766,258.06 to a Florida policyholder who had lost his home in a house fire.  That court stated "After his home was destroyed by a fire, appellee Raymond Roddy filed a claim with his insurer, appellant People’s Trust Insurance Company.  People’s denied coverage for numerous reasons, one being the claim that Roddy had made material misrepresentations on his application for insurance. The case was submitted to a jury, which awarded Roddy 
$766,258.06 in damages. The court upheld the jury award.

References

Financial services companies established in 2007
Insurance companies based in Florida
American companies established in 2007
2007 establishments in Florida